The 2019 Celebration Bowl was a college football bowl game played on December 21, 2019, with kickoff at 12:00 p.m. EST on ABC. It was the 5th edition of the Celebration Bowl, and the only one of the 2019–20 bowl games to feature FCS teams.

Teams
For the second consecutive year, the bowl was played between the Alcorn State Braves and the North Carolina A&T Aggies.

Alcorn State

Alcorn State earned their berth in the Celebration Bowl via a win over the Southern Jaguars in the SWAC Championship Game on December 7. The Braves entered the Celebration Bowl with a 9–3 overall record (6–1 in conference). This was their third appearance in the Celebration Bowl, having lost their prior two appearances (2015 and 2018); both losses were to North Carolina A&T.

North Carolina A&T

North Carolina A&T, led by second-year head coach Sam Washington, clinched their spot in the Celebration bowl on November 23 with their win over North Carolina Central. The Aggies entered the game with an overall 8–3 record (6–2 in conference). They finished runner-up in the MEAC behind Florida A&M, who were ineligible for postseason play due to NCAA sanctions. This was the Aggies' fourth appearance in the Celebration Bowl, having won each of their previous three (2015, 2017, 2018).

Game summary

Statistics

References

External links
 Game statistics at statbroadcast.com

Celebration Bowl
Celebration Bowl
North Carolina A&T Aggies football bowl games
Alcorn State Braves football bowl games
Celebration Bowl
Celebration Bowl